The 1927 Tipperary Senior Hurling Championship was the 36th staging of the Tipperary Senior Hurling Championship since its establishment by the Tipperary County Board in 1887.

Boherlahan won the championship after a 2–02 to 0–06 defeat of Éire Óg Annacarty in the final. It was their 10th championship title overall and their first title since 1928.

References

Tipperary
Tipperary Senior Hurling Championship